Lewis G. Gorton (November 18, 1859 – January 3, 1933) was president of the U.S. state of Michigan's State Agricultural College (now Michigan State University) from 1893 to 1895.

External links
Biographical Information (Michigan State University Archives & Historical Collections)

1859 births
1933 deaths
Presidents of Michigan State University